Jerova Vas is a formerly independent settlement in the northern part of the town of Grosuplje in central Slovenia. It belongs to the Municipality of Grosuplje. It is part of the traditional region of Lower Carniola and is now included with the rest of the municipality in the Central Slovenia Statistical Region.

Geography
Jerova Vas is a clustered village on the west slope of Hrib Hill (340 m) and along the base of the hill. It lies between Grosuplje and Perovo, to which it is connected by a road across the swampy Logje Meadow. Stari Breg Creek, which rises in Peč, flows below the village. Due to frequent flooding of the creek, its northern course was altered during construction of the freeway from Ljubljana to Zagreb.

Name
The Slovene name literally means "priest's village" (from Slovene  'priest'), and thus referred to an estate owned by the clergy. This explanation is confirmed by the medieval German name Phapphendorf, which has the same meaning (from Middle High German pfaffe "priest" + dorf "village"). In the past the German name was Irrdorf.

History
The economy of the village was traditionally tied to farming, especially raising potatoes and grain. Animal husbandry was also important and milk was sold to Grosuplje and Ljubljana. A water main was installed to Jerova Vas from Black Valley near Dobje in 1910. Jerova Vas was annexed by the town of Grosuplje in 1971, ending its existence as an independent settlement.

References

External links
Jerova Vas on Geopedia

Populated places in the Municipality of Grosuplje